7075 aluminium alloy (AA7075) is an aluminium alloy with zinc as the primary alloying element. It has excellent mechanical properties and exhibits good ductility, high strength, toughness, and good resistance to fatigue. It is more susceptible to embrittlement than many other aluminium alloys because of microsegregation, but has significantly better corrosion resistance than the alloys from the 2000 series. It is one of the most commonly used aluminium alloys for highly stressed structural applications and has been extensively used in aircraft structural parts.

7075 aluminium alloy's composition roughly includes 5.6–6.1% zinc, 2.1–2.5% magnesium, 1.2–1.6% copper, and less than a half percent of silicon, iron, manganese, titanium, chromium, and other metals. It is produced in many tempers, some of which are 7075-0, 7075-T6, 7075-T651.

The first 7075 was developed in secret by a Japanese company, Sumitomo Metal, in 1935, but reverse engineered by Alcoa in 1943, after examining a captured Japanese aircraft. 7075 was standardized for aerospace use in 1945. 7075 was eventually used for airframe production in the Imperial Japanese Navy.

Basic properties
Aluminium 7075A has a density of 2.810 g/cm3.

Mechanical properties
The mechanical properties of 7075 depend greatly on the tempering of the material.

7075-0
The material has an elongation (stretch before ultimate failure) of 9–10%. As is the case for all 7075 aluminum alloys, 7075-0 is highly corrosion-resistant combined with generally acceptable strength profile.

7075-T6
It has a failure elongation of 5–11%.

The T6 temper is usually achieved by homogenizing the cast 7075 at 450 °C for several hours, quenching, and then ageing at 120 °C for 24 hours. This yields the peak strength of the 7075 alloys. The strength is derived mainly from finely dispersed eta and eta' precipitates both within grains and along grain boundaries.

7075-T651
It has a failure elongation of 3–9%. These properties can change depending on the form of material used. The thicker plates may exhibit lower strengths and elongation than the numbers listed above.

7075-T7
It has a failure elongation of 13%. T7 temper is achieved by overaging (meaning aging past the peak hardness) the material. This is often accomplished by aging at 100–120 °C for several hours and then at 160–180 °C for 24 hours or more. The T7 temper produces a microstructure of mostly eta precipitates. In contrast to the T6 temper, these eta particles are much larger and prefer growth along the grain boundaries. This reduces the susceptibility to stress corrosion cracking. T7 temper is equivalent to T73 temper.

7075-RRA
The retrogression and reage (RRA) temper is a multistage heat treatment temper. Starting with a sheet in the T6 temper, it involves overaging past peak hardness (T6 temper) to near the T7 temper. A subsequent reaging at 120 °C for 24 hours returns the hardness and strength to or very nearly to T6 temper levels.

RRA treatments can be accomplished with many different procedures. The general guidelines are retrogressing between 180 and 240 °C for 15 min 10 s.

Equivalent materials

Uses
The world's first mass-production usage of the 7075  aluminum alloy was for the Mitsubishi A6M Zero fighter. The aircraft was known for its excellent maneuverability which was facilitated by the higher strength of 7075 compared to previous aluminum alloys.

7000 series alloys such as 7075 are often used in transport applications due to their high specific strength, including marine, automotive and aviation. These same properties lead to its use in rock climbing equipment, bicycle components, inline-skating-frames and hang glider airframes are commonly made from 7075 aluminium alloy. Hobby-grade RC models commonly use 7075 and 6061 for chassis plates.  7075 is used in the manufacturing of M16 rifles for the U.S. military as well as AR-15 style rifles for the civilian market. In particular high-quality M16 rifle lower and upper receivers, as well as extension tubes, are typically made from 7075-T6 alloy. Desert Tactical Arms, SIG Sauer, and French armament company PGM use it for their precision rifles. It is also commonly used in shafts for lacrosse sticks, such as the STX sabre, and camping knife and fork sets. It is a common material used in competition yo-yos as well.

Due to its high strength, low density, thermal properties, and its ability to be highly polished, 7075 is widely used in mold tool manufacturing. This alloy has been further refined into other 7000 series alloys for this application, namely 7050 and 7020.

Aerospace applications
7075 was used in the Space Shuttle SRB nozzles, and the external tank SRB beam in the Inter-tank section. The forward- and aft skirt as well as the Interstage of the S-II, the second stage of the Saturn V was made from 7075.

Applications
 Aircraft fittings
 Gears and shafts
 Missile parts
 Regulating valve parts
 Worm gears
 Aerospace/defense applications
 Automotive

Trade names
7075 has been sold under various trade names including Zicral, Ergal, and Fortal Constructal. Some 7000 series alloys sold under brand names for making molds include Alumec 79, Alumec 89, Contal, Certal, Alumould, and Hokotol.

See also
 Northwest Airlines Flight 421
 https://www.thomasnet.com/articles/metals-metal-products/all-about-7075-aluminum-properties-strength-and-uses/
 WHAT ARE THE DIFFERENCES BETWEEN 6061 AND 7075 ALUMINUM?
 7075 Aluminum: Get to Know its Properties and Uses
 Properties of 7075 aluminum alloy 
 Properties of 7075 aluminum alloy
 7075 aluminum

References

Further reading
 "Properties of Wrought Aluminum and Aluminum Alloys: 7075, Alclad 7075", Properties and Selection: Nonferrous Alloys and Special-Purpose Materials, Vol. 2, ASM Handbook, ASM International, 1990, pp. 115–116.

External links
 Aluminum 7075 Properties

Aluminium–zinc alloys